HMS LST-418 was a United States Navy  that was transferred to the Royal Navy during World War II. As with many of her class, the ship was never named. Instead, she was referred to by her hull designation.

Construction
LST-418 was laid down on 2 November 1942, under Maritime Commission (MARCOM) contract, MC hull 938, by the Bethlehem-Fairfield Shipyard, Baltimore, Maryland; launched 30 November 1942; then transferred to the United Kingdom and commissioned on 29 January 1943.

Service history 
LST-418 proceeded south to the Mediterranean and participated in Operation Shingle. LST-418 was struck from the Navy list on 16 May 1944.

See also 
 List of United States Navy LSTs

Notes 

Citations

Bibliography 

Online resources

External links

 

Ships built in Baltimore
1942 ships
LST-1-class tank landing ships of the Royal Navy
World War II amphibious warfare vessels of the United Kingdom
S3-M2-K2 ships
Maritime incidents in February 1944